CoRoT-16b is a transiting exoplanet orbiting the G or K type main sequence star CoRoT-16 2,433 light years away in the southern constellation Scutum. The planet was discovered in June 2011 by the French-led CoRoT mission.

Discovery
CoRoT-16b was detected using the transit method, which measures the brightness changes during an eclipse. However, this planet has an eccentric orbit, which is unusual due to CoRoT-16b's proximity to its parent star and the age.

Properties
Due to its orbit, CoRoT-16b is classified as a "hot Jupiter". It only takes about 5 days to orbit CoRoT-16, but has an unusually eccentric orbit. CoRoT-16b has 52.9% the mass of Jupiter, but is 17% larger than the latter. Due to the low mass and high radius, CoRoT-16b has 41% the density of water; the orbit gives it an equilibrium temperature of 1,086 K. However, this is only an estimate due to the eccentricity of CoRoT-16b.

References

Hot Jupiters
Transiting exoplanets
Exoplanets discovered in 2011
16b
Scutum (constellation)